Buda Godman ( Helen Julia Godman; December 4, 1888 – January 7, 1945) was an American criminal, actress, and singer. From 1907 to 1910, she was married to the popular songwriter and music publisher Tell Taylor. Six years after Taylor divorced her, Godman was arrested and released on bail for participating in a scheme to blackmail a wealthy widower. Godman attempted a scheme known as a "badger game," which involved framing a victim in an embarrassing and illegal situation that resulted in a staged arrest by fake law enforcement officials. Godman posed as an unmarried woman being held against her will in a hotel room across state lines, which, if true, would have been a violation of the Mann Act. The ensuing fake arrest went awry when the victim reported the incident to authorities.

In 1932, Godman, under the name of Helen Smith, was convicted for grand larceny and sentenced to prison in New York.

Early life
Buda was the daughter of a telegrapher and race track sheet-writer, Otho Godman. According to Jack Lait and Lee Mortimer, two former Chicago newspaper journalists, to protect her from growing up under bad influences, at age fifteen Buda was sent to St. Joseph’s Academy in Adrian, Michigan, a convent school. Her beauty was described as so fascinating that before maturity she stopped traffic on the streets. She was described as "petite, a wee trifle plump, with big steel-blue eyes, a tip-tilted nose, an oval face with a dimpled chin, a peewee mouth, and tiny hands and feet." As late as 1950 she was remembered as the prettiest girl ever born and raised in Chicago. Other descriptions state that she was "a beautiful woman" and "a small brunette... exceeding pretty with plenty of snap."

Criminal events

1916 blackmail scheme 
In 1916, Godman, under the alias "Alice Williams," persuaded Edward R. West, a wealthy business executive and widower from Hyde Park, Chicago, to travel with her from Chicago to New York City. West was the Vice President of the C. D. Gregg Tea and Coffee Company of St. Louis, Chicago, and New York. While "Miss Williams" and West were in their room at the Ansonia Hotel, two men, impersonating federal law enforcement agents, entered the room and "arrested" West for violation of the Mann Act.

The men transported West and Godman back to Chicago and coerced West into paying them $15,000 to avoid prosecution, embarrassment, and damage to his and Alice's reputation. West reported the incident after becoming suspicious.

Indicted co-conspirators in the scheme were  Buda Godman, Helen Evers, Homer T. French, William Butler, Doc Brady (alias James Christian), and George Irwin. Several of the male blackmailers were sentenced to prison. Godman was released on $10,000 bail ($877,000.00 in 2017) provided by two friends: Mrs. Susie Summerville and Mrs. Rene Bernice Morrow, née Martin.  Morrow, in 1912, had been acquitted of the charge of murdering her husband. Summerville and Morrow forfeited bail when Godman skipped town and vanished for four years. In 1921, citing lack of evidence, the charges were dropped.

Cecil Dudley Gregg (1867–1925) of St. Louis, who had no direct connection with the blackmail incident, was the founder and president of C. D. Gregg Tea & Coffee Co.

This particular scheme is known as badger gaming—an extortion tactic where an attractive woman lures a wealthy man into a compromising position; an associate breaks in, takes some pictures, then they all sit down to haggle over the price.

Chattanooga 
Buda, under the alias of Louise French, and Jack French were arrested February 2, 1921, in Chattanooga for producing and attempting to pass raised bills, a counterfeiting technique of gluing numerals onto low-denomination bills to make them look like higher denomination bills.

Denver 
Godman was a paramour of the Jackie French (né John Homer French), bookmaker for Lou Blonger.

Havana, Cuba, and New York 
After the 1916 scandal, up through the mid-1920s, Godman became the protege of Charles A. Stoneham, who, among other things, owned the New York Giants baseball club and, in Havana, Cuba, owned the Cuba-America Jockey Club, the Havana Casino, and the Oriental Park Racetrack.  For years, Godman's Park Avenue apartment served as a stage for criminals that included Arnold Rothstein, the gambler; Owney Madden, the Bear King; race track notables, and Broadway climbers. To the other residents of the apartment house, she was known as Mrs. Stoneham; for others, she had other names; and meanwhile the 1916 blackmail charges in Chicago had been dropped.

1932 Glemby jewelry heist 

In 1932, Godman, under the alias "Helen Smith," was arrested and charged for an attempt to serve as a fence for $305,000 worth of stolen jewels from New York businessman Harry C. Glemby. On November 10, 1932, Godman was convicted for grand larceny and sentenced to prison in New York for four to eight years. She began her sentence on November 17, 1932, as prisoner number 1652 at the Auburn Prison and, with other inmates, was transferred on June 30, 1933, to the Bedford Hills Prison.

Aliases 
 Helen Strong
 Alice Williams
 Helen Smith
 Louise French (1921)
 Helen Taylor (she was married to Tell Taylor from 1907 to 1910)
 Mrs. Stoneham (fictitiously married to Charles Abraham Stoneham)
 Helen Daniels, widow of Charles Daniels

Associates 
 Dapper Don Collins (pseudonym of Robert Arthur Tourbillon; 1880–1950) (1916, Chicago)
 Doc Brady (pseudonym of James Christian) (1916, Chicago), alias W. J. Cross
 John Homer French (1916, Chicago); aliases: Jackie French, Homer T. French, Jack H. French, John Fitch, John Filmore
 George W. Irwin (1916, Chicago)
 Helen Evers, wife of George Irwin

Family

Parents 
Godman was the daughter of Otho James Godman (1863–1910) and Julia Conklin (1866–1930) of Chicago. Otho had been a well-known telegraph operator and, in 1903, the first to operate a wireless telegraph on August 28, 1903, from a ship on Lake Michigan — the ship being the SS Milwaukee. Otho was also a horse race-sheet reporter, according to several sources.

Siblings 
Godman had two older siblings: Hester Ann (1886–1923) and James Arthur (1887–1945). Hester accompanied her sister and Charles A. Stoneham on the trip to Cuba and its return. James followed his father in becoming a telegrapher.

Marriage 
From 1907 to 1910, Godman was married to Chicago music publisher and composer Tell Taylor. They married November 4, 1907, in Chicago. Godman had met Taylor about two years prior when Taylor had been a dinner guest at the St. Joseph's Convent and Academy in Adrian, Michigan, where Helen had been attending school. Taylor had just started his songwriting career and was appearing with a traveling stage company in Adrian. Godman and Taylor had become good friends before dinner was over but did not correspond afterward. Two years later, while attending the performance of "The Girl Question," by Howard, Adams, and Hough at the La Salle Theater in Chicago, Godman recognized Taylor and sent a note to him backstage, and they became reacquainted. After spending much of their time together lunching and dining during the following week, they met once again for dinner at a downtown Chicago hotel, and sent for a judge to marry them in the hotel's parlor.

In 1910, Tell filed for divorce from Buda in Chicago. In late September of that year, the divorce was granted. In the proceedings, Tell accused Buda of having "affinities" with other vaudevillians and stated, "I married Buda when we both were drunk and I found out she was quite incapable of loyalty to anyone."

Death 
Under the name Helen Daniels, widow of Charles Daniels, Godman died January 7, 1945, in Queens, New York.  At the time of her death, she lived at 38-19 50th Street in Sunnyside, Queens.  She was buried Sunday, January 7, 1945, at the Sleepy Hollow Cemetery in Sleepy Hollow, New York, her grave-site marked by a simple and unassuming granite headstone.

Published residences 
 September 25, 1920: 7437 Merrill Avenue, Chicago
 Source:  SS Morro Castle Manifest, departing Havana, Cuba September 25, 1920, arriving New York City September 30, 1920, Ellis Island Archives
 Charles A. Stoneham is listed on the same SS Morro Castle Manifest
 March 31, 1921: 7437 Merrill Avenue, Chicago
 Source: SS Ulua Manifest, departing Havana, Cuba March 31, 1921, arriving New York City April 4, 1921, Ellis Island Archives
 Charles A. Stoneham is listed on the same SS Ulua Manifest
 Hester Ann Gagen (1886–1923), Buda's sister, is also on the same SS Ulua Manifest
 November 11, 1932: West 54th Street, New York City
 January 1945: 38-19 50th Street in Sunnyside, Queens

Notes and references

Notes

Books, magazines, journals, dissertations, public records, and websites

Newspapers 

1888 births
1945 deaths
American outlaws
Depression-era gangsters
American female organized crime figures
Burials at Sleepy Hollow Cemetery